The Vallarta Botanical Garden is a  botanical garden at 1,300 ft (400 m) above sea level, near Puerto Vallarta Mexico.

The garden was founded in 2004 and has been open to the public since 2005. The collections showcase plants of the Tropical Dry Forest Biome, native to the region around Puerto Vallarta and in which the gardens are located, as well as exotics from around the world. Orchid conservation and propagation is a focus of the garden's mission. These can be found on trees throughout the grounds and in the Holstein Orchid and Vanilla House.  Other notable collections include oaks, bromeliads, agaves, cactus, rhododendrons and wild palms. The Vallarta Botanical Gardens actively participates in public environmental education through tours and classes.

The gardens feature hiking trails both through the native forest and the manicured garden grounds.  Visitors are also welcome to swim in the Rio Horcones, the tropical river that runs through the property.  Bird watchers will find the most birding activity early in the morning or later in the day.

The Vallarta Botanical Garden receives no government funding and there is a small admission charge. Vallarta Botanical Garden is a membership organization.

Mission Statement 

To create Mexico's foremost botanical garden for the propagation, study, discovery, conservation, and display of Mexican native plants for the enjoyment of Puerto Vallarta's residents and our visitors.

Conservation 

The Vallarta Botanical Garden is a leading environmental and conservation organization in Puerto Vallarta, Mexico.   The garden's display, study and propagation of Mexican native plants and its track record in conservation has been a tourism generator for Mexico and has also inspired a love for nature in children.  Since its founding in 2004, the Vallarta Botanical Garden has focused on preserving the unique and unspoiled tropical forest that surrounds it. One of the most biodiverse areas in the world and home to several endangered species, this area is also one of the most carbon-dense ecosystems on the planet - its protection is of international importance, and its deforestation could have dramatic effects on climate.

Efforts are underway  to protect the unique tropical ecosystem which surrounds the garden by the establishment of a Forest Preserve with Protected status.   In addition, resources are necessary to establish the first known Ocelot Sanctuary on newly acquired land.  This will highlight the presence of the endangered small cat and the importance of the Jaguar Corridor in their survival.

Affiliations
 Asociación Mexicana de Orquideología Official Asociación Mexicana de Orquideología website
 Asociación Mexicana de Jardines Botánicos - Facebook page''' Facebook page of Asociación Mexicana de Jardines Botánicos website
 American Public Garden Association  (APGA) Official American Public Garden Association website
 Botanical Garden Conservation International (BGCI) Official Botanical Garden Conservation International website
 Friends of Vallarta Botanical Gardens, A.C. Official Friends of Vallarta Botanical Gardens, A.C. website
 Canadian Garden Tourism Council Official Canadian Garden Tourism Council website
 Canadian Garden Counsel Official Canadian Garden Counsel website

Sister Garden relationships: San Francisco Botanical Garden and with Santa Barbara Botanical Garden

International Peace Garden
On February 16, 2017, the Cheryl L. Wheeler International Peace Garden of Mexico at the Vallarta Botanical Gardens was dedicated.  The garden within the gardens is meant to be a place of contemplation and of peacefulness.  Besides consisting of many native flowers and plants, it offers a section of monuments to our lost loved ones, as well as the interfaith chapel, Our Lady of the Garden, the Peace Garden's jewel.  The chapel was updated in 2021 with the permanent art installation "Los Angelitos" by David Allen Burns and Austin Young of Fallen Fruit.

Current Board of Directors

Awards and recognition

2013
"Top 10 North American Gardens Worth Travelling For" by the North American Garden Tourism Conference's International Tourism Award Jury

2015
"Top 10 North American Gardens Worth Travelling For" by the North American Garden Tourism Conference's International Tourism Award Jury

USA Today ranked it as one of the 10 Best Botanical Gardens that "Think beyond the flower".

2017
The gardens was the recipient of the 2017 International Peace Garden, presented by the International Peace Garden Foundation .

2018
USA Today ranked it number four in its list of 10 "Best Botanical Gardens".

2019
"Top 10 North American Gardens Worth Travelling For" by the North American Garden Tourism Conference's International Tourism Award Jury

USA Today ranked it number six in its list of 10 "Best Botanical Gardens".

"The Best Kept Secret" award by the readers of the Vallarta Tribune.

"Best View Restaurant" award by the readers of the Vallarta Tribune.

2021
USA Today ranked it number four in its list of 10 "Best Botanical Gardens".

2022
American Public Garden Association's "Garden of Excellence" Award.  The first botanical garden outside of the United States to win this award.

USA Today ranked it number three in its list of 10 "Best Botanical Gardens".

See also 

 List of botanical gardens

References

External links 
 Official Vallarta Botanical Gardens website
 Official Vallarta Botanical Gardens' Entry on the Botanic Garden Conservation International (BGCI) website
 International Peace Park announcement (IPGF) website
 Vallarta Botanical Gardens' Article in Virtual Vallarta's website
 El Papelillo, Monthly magazine for Vallarta Botanical Gardens website 
 Gallery of plants found at the Vallarta Botanical Gardens website

Botanical gardens in Mexico
Puerto Vallarta
Protected areas of Jalisco
Protected areas established in 2004
2004 establishments in Mexico
Tourist attractions in Jalisco